The Broadkill River is a river flowing to Delaware Bay in southern Delaware in the United States.

The Broadkill flows for its entire length in eastern Sussex County. It issues from Wagamons Pond in the town of Milton; the pond is fed by two tributaries known as Ingram Branch and Pemberton Branch.  From Milton, the Broadkill River flows generally eastwardly, passing through wetlands and salt marshes in the Prime Hook National Wildlife Refuge.  After approaching to within  of Delaware Bay, the river parallels the shoreline a short distance inland for approximately  before flowing into the bay in northwest of Lewes. The United States Coast Guard maintains a station near the mouth of the Broadkill at Green Hill. The mouth is connected to Rehoboth Bay by the Lewes and Rehoboth Canal, which forms part of the Atlantic Intracoastal Waterway.

In the 19th century the river was the center of a regional shipbuilding industry, arising from the access it furnished to inland forests; the industry fell into decline in the 1890s.

A footpath known as the Governors Walk follows the Broadkill in central Milton.  The Nature Conservancy established a preserve along the river downstream of Milton in 1998.  , an annual canoe and kayak race was being held on the river in Milton.

Variant names and spellings
The United States Board on Geographic Names issued an opinion clarifying "Broadkill River" as the stream's name in 1961. According to the Geographic Names Information System, it has also been known historically as:
Broad Creek 
Broad Kill
Broad Kill Creek 
Broadkill Creek 
Broadkiln Creek
Lewis Creek

See also
List of Delaware rivers
Thomas Winsmore (schooner)

References 

Rivers of Delaware
Rivers of Sussex County, Delaware
Tributaries of Delaware Bay